Ragunda Municipality is a municipality in Jämtland County in northern Sweden. Its seat is in Hammarstrand.

The present municipality was formed in 1974, when "old" Ragunda Municipality was amalgamated with the municipalities of Fors and Stugun. Further amalgamations have been discussed due to declining population, but have not been carried out.

Ragunda Municipality is known for being the site of the King Chulalongkorn Memorial Building, which is by the village Utanede. Designed as a Thai royal pavilion, the only one of its kind outside Thailand, it was raised in 1997 in commemoration of King Chulalongkorn's visit there a century earlier.

Döda Fallet (The dead waterfall) is an extinct whitewater rapid in a nature reserve and one of the major tourist attractions of the municipality.

Localities
There are four localities (or urban areas) in Ragunda Municipality:

The municipal seat in bold

Twin cities
 Karstula, Finland

Photo gallery

See also
Borgvattnet - The Haunted Vicarage

References

External links

Ragunda Municipality - Official site

Municipalities of Jämtland County